Terry Haass (1923-2016) was a Czechoslovak-born French artist known for her printmaking, painting, and sculpture.

Biography
Haass née Goldmannová was born on 17 November 1923 in Český Těšín, Czechoslovakia. in 1938 she and her family fled from antisemitism in Czechoslovakia to Paris, France then fled the Nazi invasion there, settling in New York in 1941. Around that time she married Walter Haass who she later divorced.

In New York Haass attended the Art Students League of New York and the Atelier 17. In 1951 she and fellow artist Harry Hoehn co-directed the New York location of Atelier 17. By the end of that year Haass moved back to Paris. In 1952 Haass had a solo exhibition at the Smithsonian Institution. In 1953 Haass' work was included in the Museum of Modern Art's Young American Printmakers exhibition.

Haass studied and worked in Paris, becoming a French citizen in 1963.

Haass died on 1 March 2016 in Paris.

References

External links
 images of Haass' work on ArtNet

1923 births
2016 deaths
20th-century French women artists
French printmakers
French people of Czech-Jewish descent
Atelier 17 alumni
Art Students League of New York alumni
People from Český Těšín
French women printmakers
Czechoslovak emigrants to France
French expatriates in the United States